Goričica pod Krimom is a village in the Municipality of Brezovica in central Slovenia. Its territory extends from the right bank of the Ljubljanica River to the foothills of Mount Krim, the dominant peak south of Ljubljana. The municipality is part of the traditional region of Inner Carniola and is now included in the Central Slovenia Statistical Region.

Name
The name of the settlement was changed from Goričica to Goričica pod Krimom in 1953.

References

External links

Goričica pod Krimom on Geopedia

Populated places in the Municipality of Brezovica